Bob Wheaton (born 28 December 1941) is a Canadian former backstroke swimmer. He competed in two events at the 1960 Summer Olympics.

References

External links
 

1941 births
Living people
Canadian male backstroke swimmers
Olympic swimmers of Canada
Swimmers at the 1960 Summer Olympics
Swimmers from Victoria, British Columbia
Pan American Games medalists in swimming
Pan American Games silver medalists for Canada
Commonwealth Games medallists in swimming
Commonwealth Games silver medallists for Canada
Commonwealth Games bronze medallists for Canada
Swimmers at the 1959 Pan American Games
Swimmers at the 1958 British Empire and Commonwealth Games
Medalists at the 1959 Pan American Games
20th-century Canadian people
21st-century Canadian people
Medallists at the 1958 British Empire and Commonwealth Games